A laser line level is a tool combining a spirit level and/or plumb bob with a laser to display an accurately horizontal or vertical illuminated line on a surface the laser line level is laid against.
Laser line levels are used wherever accurate verticals and horizontals are required, typically in the construction and cabinetry industries. Some models are inexpensive enough for do-it-yourself applications.

The laser beam is fanned to produce a thin plane beam accurately horizontal or vertical, rather than a pinpoint beam. The axis of the laser is offset from the wall, so that a pinpoint beam would be parallel to and offset from the wall, and would not illuminate it; the fanned beam will intersect the wall, creating an accurately horizontal (or vertical) illuminated line along it.

The machine is set up using the built-in spirit level or plumb bob, and the line along the surface is then guaranteed to be accurately horizontal or vertical to within a certain tolerance, specified either in millimetres per metre or fractions of an inch over a specified distance in feet. A more advanced device may be accurate to within 0.3 mm/m; while lower-end models may be closer to 1.5 mm/m.

The illuminated line is necessarily absolutely straight, so that the line level can be used as a straightedge; for example, to see if a shelf is warped, even if not horizontal.

See also
 Dumpy level
 Theodolite
 List of laser articles
 Laser Machine Control

References

Construction equipment
Construction surveying
Laser applications
Surveying instruments
Woodworking measuring instruments